Pleiotropy (from Greek  , 'more', and  , 'way') occurs when one gene influences two or more seemingly unrelated phenotypic traits. Such a gene that exhibits multiple phenotypic expression is called a pleiotropic gene. Mutation in a pleiotropic gene may have an effect on several traits simultaneously, due to the gene coding for a product used by a myriad of cells or different targets that have the same signaling function.

Pleiotropy can arise from several distinct but potentially overlapping mechanisms, such as gene pleiotropy, developmental pleiotropy, and selectional pleiotropy. Gene pleiotropy occurs when a gene product interacts with multiple other proteins or catalyzes multiple reactions. Developmental pleiotropy occurs when mutations have multiple effects on the resulting phenotype. Selectional pleiotropy occurs when the resulting phenotype has many effects on fitness (depending on factors such as age and gender).

An example of pleiotropy is phenylketonuria, an inherited disorder that affects the level of phenylalanine, an amino acid that can be obtained from food, in the human body. Phenylketonuria causes this amino acid to increase in amount in the body, which can be very dangerous. The disease is caused by a defect in a single gene on chromosome 12 that codes for enzyme phenylalanine hydroxylase, that affects multiple systems, such as the nervous and integumentary system.

Pleiotropic gene action can limit the rate of multivariate evolution when natural selection, sexual selection or artificial selection on one trait favors one allele, while selection on other traits favors a different allele. Some gene evolution is harmful to an organism. Genetic correlations and responses to selection most often exemplify pleiotropy.

History
Pleiotropic traits had been previously recognized in the scientific community but had not been experimented on until Gregor Mendel's 1866 pea plant experiment. Mendel recognized that certain pea plant traits (seed coat color, flower color, and axial spots) seemed to be inherited together; however, their correlation to a single gene has never been proven. The term "pleiotropie" was first coined by Ludwig Plate in his Festschrift, which was published in 1910. He originally defined pleiotropy as occurring when "several characteristics are dependent upon ... [inheritance]; these characteristics will then always appear together and may thus appear correlated". This definition is still used today.

After Plate's definition, Hans Gruneberg was the first to study the mechanisms of pleiotropy. In 1938 Gruneberg published an article dividing pleiotropy into two distinct types: "genuine" and "spurious" pleiotropy. "Genuine" pleiotropy is when two distinct primary products arise from one locus. "Spurious" pleiotropy, on the other hand, is either when one primary product is utilized in different ways or when one primary product initiates a cascade of events with different phenotypic consequences. Gruneberg came to these distinctions after experimenting on rats with skeletal mutations. He recognized that "spurious" pleiotropy was present in the mutation, while "genuine" pleiotropy was not, thus partially invalidating his own original theory. Through subsequent research, it has been established that Gruneberg's definition of "spurious" pleiotropy is what we now identify simply as "pleiotropy".

In 1941 American geneticists George Beadle and Edward Tatum further invalidated Gruneberg's definition of "genuine" pleiotropy, advocating instead for the "one gene-one enzyme" hypothesis that was originally introduced by French biologist Lucien Cuénot in 1903. This hypothesis shifted future research regarding pleiotropy towards how a single gene can produce various phenotypes.

In the mid-1950s Richard Goldschmidt and Ernst Hadorn, through separate individual research, reinforced the faultiness of "genuine" pleiotropy. A few years later, Hadorn partitioned pleiotropy into a "mosaic" model (which states that one locus directly affects two phenotypic traits) and a "relational" model (which is analogous to "spurious" pleiotropy). These terms are no longer in use but have contributed to the current understanding of pleiotropy.

By accepting the one gene-one enzyme hypothesis, scientists instead focused on how uncoupled phenotypic traits can be affected by genetic recombination and mutations, applying it to populations and evolution. This view of pleiotropy, "universal pleiotropy", defined as locus mutations being capable of affecting essentially all traits, was first implied by Ronald Fisher's Geometric Model in 1930. This mathematical model illustrates how evolutionary fitness depends on the independence of phenotypic variation from random changes (that is, mutations). It theorizes that an increasing phenotypic independence corresponds to a decrease in the likelihood that a given mutation will result in an increase in fitness. Expanding on Fisher's work, Sewall Wright provided more evidence in his 1968 book Evolution and the Genetics of Populations: Genetic and Biometric Foundations by using molecular genetics to support the idea of "universal pleiotropy". The concepts of these various studies on evolution have seeded numerous other research projects relating to individual fitness.

In 1957 evolutionary biologist George C. Williams theorized that antagonistic effects will be exhibited during an organism's life cycle if it is closely linked and pleiotropic. Natural selection favors genes that are more beneficial prior to reproduction than after (leading to an increase in reproductive success). Knowing this, Williams argued that if only close linkage was present, then beneficial traits will occur both before and after reproduction due to natural selection. This, however, is not observed in nature, and thus antagonistic pleiotropy contributes to the slow deterioration with age (senescence).

Mechanism
Pleiotropy describes the genetic effect of a single gene on multiple phenotypic traits. The underlying mechanism is genes that code for a product that is either used by various cells or has a cascade-like signaling function that affects various targets.

Polygenic traits 

Most genetic traits are polygenic in nature: controlled by many genetic variants, each of small effect. These genetic variants can reside in protein coding or non-coding regions of the genome. In this context pleiotropy refers to the influence that a specific genetic variant, e.g., a single nucleotide polymorphism or SNP, has on two or more distinct traits.

Genome-wide association studies (GWAS) and machine learning analysis of large genomic datasets have led to the construction of SNP based polygenic predictors for human traits such as height, bone density, and many disease risks. Similar predictors exist for plant and animal species and are used in agricultural breeding.

One measure of pleiotropy is the fraction of genetic variance that is common between two distinct complex human traits: e.g., height vs bone density, breast cancer vs heart attack risk, or diabetes vs hypothyroidism risk. This has been calculated for hundreds of pairs of traits, with results shown in the Table. In most cases examined the genomic regions controlling each trait are largely disjoint, with only modest overlap.

Thus, at least for complex human traits so far examined, pleiotropy is limited in extent.

Models for the origin 
One basic model of pleiotropy's origin describes a single gene locus to the expression of a certain trait. The locus affects the expressed trait only through changing the expression of other loci. Over time, that locus would affect two traits by interacting with a second locus. Directional selection for both traits during the same time period would increase the positive correlation between the traits, while selection on only one trait would decrease the positive correlation between the two traits. Eventually, traits that underwent directional selection simultaneously were linked by a single gene, resulting in pleiotropy.

Other more complex models compensate for some of the basic model's oversights, such as multiple traits or assumptions about how the loci affect the traits. They also propose the idea that pleiotropy increases the phenotypic variation of both traits since a single mutation on a gene would have twice the effect.

Evolution 
Pleiotropy can have an effect on the evolutionary rate of genes and allele frequencies. Traditionally, models of pleiotropy have predicted that evolutionary rate of genes is related negatively with pleiotropyas the number of traits of an organism increases, the evolutionary rates of genes in the organism's population decrease. However, this relationship has not been clearly found in empirical studies.

In mating, for many animals the signals and receptors of sexual communication may have evolved simultaneously as the expression of a single gene, instead of the result of selection on two independent genes, one that affects the signaling trait and one that affects the receptor trait. In such a case, pleiotropy would facilitate mating and survival. However, pleiotropy can act negatively as well. A study on seed beetles found that intralocus sexual conflict arises when selection for certain alleles of a gene that are beneficial for one sex causes expression of potentially harmful traits by the same gene in the other sex, especially if the gene is located on an autosomal chromosome.

Pleiotropic genes act as an arbitrating force in speciation. William R. Rice and Ellen E. Hostert (1993) conclude that the observed prezygotic isolation in their studies is a product of pleiotropy's balancing role in indirect selection. By imitating the traits of all-infertile hybridized species, they noticed that the fertilization of eggs was prevented in all eight of their separate studies, a likely effect of pleiotropic genes on speciation. Likewise, pleiotropic gene's stabilizing selection allows for the allele frequency to be altered.

Studies on fungal evolutionary genomics have shown pleiotropic traits that simultaneously affect adaptation and reproductive isolation, converting adaptations directly to speciation. A particularly telling case of this effect is host specificity in pathogenic ascomycetes and specifically, in venturia, the fungus responsible for apple scab. These parasitic fungi each adapts to a host, and are only able to mate within a shared host after obtaining resources. Since a single toxin gene or virulence allele can grant the ability to colonize the host, adaptation and reproductive isolation are instantly facilitated, and in turn, pleiotropically causes adaptive speciation. The studies on fungal evolutionary genomics will further elucidate the earliest stages of divergence as a result of gene flow, and provide insight into pleiotropically induced adaptive divergence in other eukaryotes.

Antagonistic pleiotropy 

Sometimes, a pleiotropic gene may be both harmful and beneficial to an organism, which is referred to as antagonistic pleiotropy. This may occur when the trait is beneficial for the organism's early life, but not its late life. Such "trade-offs" are possible since natural selection affects traits expressed earlier in life, when most organisms are most fertile, more than traits expressed later in life.

This idea is central to the antagonistic pleiotropy hypothesis, which was first developed by G.C. Williams in 1957. Williams suggested that some genes responsible for increased fitness in the younger, fertile organism contribute to decreased fitness later in life, which may give an evolutionary explanation for senescence. An example is the p53 gene, which suppresses cancer but also suppresses stem cells, which replenish worn-out tissue.

Unfortunately, the process of antagonistic pleiotropy may result in an altered evolutionary path with delayed adaptation, in addition to effectively cutting the overall benefit of any alleles by roughly half. However, antagonistic pleiotropy also lends greater evolutionary "staying power" to genes controlling beneficial traits, since an organism with a mutation to those genes would have a decreased chance of successfully reproducing, as multiple traits would be affected, potentially for the worse.

Sickle cell anemia is a classic example of the mixed benefit given by the staying power of pleiotropic genes, as the mutation to Hb-S provides the fitness benefit of malaria resistance to heterozygotes, while homozygotes have significantly lowered life expectancy. Since both of these states are linked to the same mutated gene, large populations today are susceptible to sickle cell despite it being a fitness-impairing genetic disorder.

Examples

Albinism 
Albinism is the mutation of the TYR gene, also termed tyrosinase. This mutation causes the most common form of albinism. The mutation alters the production of melanin, thereby affecting melanin-related and other dependent traits throughout the organism. Melanin is a substance made by the body that is used to absorb light and provides coloration to the skin. Indications of albinism are the absence of color in an organism's eyes, hair, and skin, due to the lack of melanin. Some forms of albinism are also known to have symptoms that manifest themselves through rapid-eye movement, light sensitivity, and strabismus.

Autism and schizophrenia 
Pleiotropy in genes has been linked between certain psychiatric disorders as well. Deletion in the 22q11.2 region of chromosome 22 has been associated with schizophrenia and autism. Schizophrenia and autism are linked to the same gene deletion but manifest very differently from each other. The resulting phenotype depends on the stage of life at which the individual develops the disorder. Childhood manifestation of the gene deletion is typically associated with autism, while adolescent and later expression of the gene deletion often manifests in schizophrenia or other psychotic disorders. Though the disorders are linked by genetics, there is no increased risk found for adult schizophrenia in patients who experienced autism in childhood.

A 2013 study also genetically linked five psychiatric disorders, including schizophrenia and autism. The link was a single nucleotide polymorphism of two genes involved in calcium channel signaling with neurons. One of these genes, CACNA1C, has been found to influence cognition. It has been associated with autism, as well as linked in studies to schizophrenia and bipolar disorder. These particular studies show clustering of these diseases within patients themselves or families. The estimated heritability of schizophrenia is 70% to 90%, therefore the pleiotropy of genes is crucial since it causes an increased risk for certain psychotic disorders and can aid psychiatric diagnosis.

Phenylketonuria (PKU) 

A common example of pleiotropy is the human disease phenylketonuria (PKU). This disease causes mental retardation and reduced hair and skin pigmentation, and can be caused by any of a large number of mutations in the single gene on chromosome 12 that codes for the enzyme phenylalanine hydroxylase, which converts the amino acid phenylalanine to tyrosine. Depending on the mutation involved, this conversion is reduced or ceases entirely. Unconverted phenylalanine builds up in the bloodstream and can lead to levels that are toxic to the developing nervous system of newborn and infant children. The most dangerous form of this is called classic PKU, which is common in infants. The baby seems normal at first but actually incurs permanent intellectual disability. This can cause symptoms such as mental retardation, abnormal gait and posture, and delayed growth. Because tyrosine is used by the body to make melanin (a component of the pigment found in the hair and skin), failure to convert normal levels of phenylalanine to tyrosine can lead to fair hair and skin.
The frequency of this disease varies greatly. Specifically, in the United States, PKU is found at a rate of nearly 1 in 10,000 births. Due to newborn screening, doctors are able to detect PKU in a baby sooner. This allows them to start treatment early, preventing the baby from suffering from the severe effects of PKU. PKU is caused by a mutation in the PAH gene, whose role is to instruct the body on how to make phenylalanine hydroxylase. Phenylalanine hydroxylase is what converts the phenylalanine, taken in through diet, into other things that the body can use. The mutation often decreases the effectiveness or rate at which the hydroxylase breaks down the phenylalanine. This is what causes the phenylalanine to build up in the body. The way to treat PKU is to manage one's diet. Phenylalanine is ingested through food, so a diet should decrease types of foods that have high amounts of phenylalanine. Foods with high levels of protein must be avoided. These include breast milk, eggs, chicken, beef, pork, fish, nuts, and other foods. A special PKU formula can be obtained in order for the body to have protein.

Sickle cell anemia 

Sickle cell anemia is a genetic disease that causes deformed red blood cells with a rigid, crescent shape instead of the normal flexible, round shape. It is caused by a change in one nucleotide, a point mutation in the HBB gene. The HBB gene encodes information to make the beta-globin subunit of hemoglobin, which is the protein red blood cells use to carry oxygen throughout the body. Sickle cell anemia occurs when the HBB gene mutation causes both beta-globin subunits of hemoglobin to change into hemoglobinS (HbS).

Sickle cell anemia is a pleiotropic disease because the expression of a single mutated HBB gene produces numerous consequences throughout the body. The mutated hemoglobin forms polymers and clumps together causing the deoxygenated sickle red blood cells to assume the disfigured sickle shape. As a result, the cells are inflexible and cannot easily flow through blood vessels, increasing the risk of blood clots and possibly depriving vital organs of oxygen. Some complications associated with sickle cell anemia include pain, damaged organs, strokes, high blood pressure, and loss of vision. Sickle red blood cells also have a shortened lifespan and die prematurely.

Marfan syndrome 

Marfan syndrome (MFS) is an autosomal dominant disorder which affects 1 in 5–10,000 people. MFS arises from a mutation in the FBN1 gene, which encodes for the glycoprotein fibrillin-1, a major constituent of extracellular microfibrils which form connective tissues.  Over 1,000 different mutations in FBN1 have been found to result in abnormal function of fibrillin, which consequently relates to connective tissues elongating progressively and weakening. Because these fibers are found in tissues throughout the body, mutations in this gene can have a widespread effect on certain systems, including the skeletal, cardiovascular, and nervous system, as well as the eyes and lungs.

Without medical intervention, prognosis of Marfan syndrome can range from moderate to life-threatening, with 90% of known causes of death in diagnosed patients relating to cardiovascular complications and congestive cardiac failure.  Other characteristics of MFS include an increased arm span and decreased upper to lower body ratio.

"Mini-muscle" allele 
A gene recently discovered in laboratory house mice, termed "mini-muscle", causes, when mutated, a 50% reduction in hindlimb muscle mass as its primary effect (the phenotypic effect by which it was originally identified). In addition to smaller hindlimb muscle mass, the mutant mice exhibit lower heart rates during physical activity, and a higher endurance. Mini Muscle Mice also exhibit larger kidneys and livers. All of these morphological deviations influence the behavior and metabolism of the mouse. For example, mice with the Mini Muscle mutation were observed to have a higher per-gram aerobic capacity. The mini-muscle allele shows a mendelian recessive behavior. The mutation is a single nucleotide polymorphism (SNP) in an intron of the myosin heavy polypeptide4 gene.

DNA repair proteins
DNA repair pathways that repair damage to cellular DNA use many different proteins.  These proteins often have other functions in addition to DNA repair. In humans, defects in some of these multifunctional proteins can cause widely differing clinical phenotypes.  As an example, mutations in the XPB gene that encodes the largest subunit of the basal Transcription factor II H have several pleiotropic effects.  XPB mutations are known to be deficient in nucleotide excision repair of DNA and in the quite separate process of gene transcription.   In humans, XPB mutations can give rise to the cancer-prone disorder xeroderma pigmentosum or the noncancer-prone multisystem disorder trichothiodystrophy. Another example in humans is the ERCC6 gene, which encodes a protein that mediates DNA repair, transcription, and other cellular processes throughout the body. Mutations in ERCC6 are associated with disorders of the eye (retinal dystrophy), heart (cardiac arrhythmias), and immune system (lymphocyte immunodeficiency).

Chickens 

Chickens exhibit various traits affected by pleiotropic genes. Some chickens exhibit frizzle feather trait, where their feathers all curl outward and upward rather than lying flat against the body. Frizzle feather was found to stem from a deletion in the genomic region coding for α-Keratin. This gene seems to pleiotropically lead to other abnormalities like increased metabolism, higher food consumption, accelerated heart rate, and delayed sexual maturity.

Domesticated chickens underwent a rapid selection process that led to unrelated phenotypes having high correlations, suggesting pleiotropic, or at least close linkage, effects between comb mass and physiological structures related to reproductive abilities. Both males and females with larger combs have higher bone density and strength, which allows females to deposit more calcium into eggshells. This linkage is further evidenced by the fact that two of the genes, HAO1 and BMP2, affecting medullary bone (the part of the bone that transfers calcium into developing eggshells) are located at the same locus as the gene affecting comb mass. HAO1 and BMP2 also display pleiotropic effects with commonly desired domestic chicken behavior; those chickens who express higher levels of these two genes in bone tissue produce more eggs and display less egg incubation behavior.

See also 

 cis-regulatory element
 Enhancer (genetics)
 Epistasis
 Genetic correlation
 Metabolic network
 Metabolic supermice
 Polygene

References

External links
 Pleiotropy is 100 years old

Evolutionary developmental biology
Genetics concepts